Simona Madjovska (born 27 July 2004) is a Macedonian female handballer for BSV Sachsen Zwickau and the North Macedonia national team.

She represented the North Macedonia at the 2022 European Women's Handball Championship.

References

External links

1993 births
Living people
People from Bitola
Expatriate handball players